The 1987 South Australian Open was a men's Grand Prix tennis circuit tournament played on outdoor grass courts in Adelaide, Australia. It was the 86th edition of the tournament and was held from 30 December 1986 until 5 January 1987. Seventh-seeded Wally Masur won the singles title.

Finals

Singles

 Wally Masur defeated  Bill Scanlon 6–4, 7–6(7–2)
 It was Masur's 1st singles title of the year and the 2nd of his career.

Doubles

 Ivan Lendl /  Bill Scanlon defeated  Peter Doohan /  Laurie Warder 6–7, 6–3, 6–4

References

External links
 ATP tournament profile
 ITF tournament edition details

 
South Australian Open
South Australian Open
South Australian Open, 1987
South Australian Open
South Australian Open